Salmaniyeh (also Romanized as Salmānīyeh) is a village in Halil Rural District, in the Central District of Jiroft County, Kerman Province, Iran. At the 2006 census, its population was 474, in 102 families.

References 

Populated places in Jiroft County